Spielman is an unincorporated community in Washington County, Maryland, United States. The Hogmire-Berryman Farm was listed on the National Register of Historic Places in 1980.

References

Unincorporated communities in Washington County, Maryland
Unincorporated communities in Maryland